Howard Winchel Koch (April 11, 1916 – February 16, 2001) was an American producer and director of film and television.

Life and career
Koch was born in New York City, the son of Beatrice (Winchel) and William Jacob Koch. His family was Jewish. He attended DeWitt Clinton High School and the Peddie School in Hightstown, New Jersey. He began his film career as an employee at Universal Studios office in New York then made his Hollywood filmmaking debut in 1947 as an assistant director. He worked as a producer for the first time in 1953 and a year later made his directing debut. In 1964, Paramount Pictures appointed him head of film production, a position he held until 1966 when he left to set up his own production company. He had a production pact with Paramount for over 15 years.

Among his numerous television productions, Howard W. Koch produced the Academy Awards show on eight occasions. Dedicated to the industry, he served as President of the Academy of Motion Picture Arts and Sciences from 1977 to 1979. In 1990 the Academy honored him with The Jean Hersholt Humanitarian Award and in 1991 he received the Frank Capra Achievement Award from the Directors Guild of America.

Together with actor Telly Savalas, Howard Koch owned the thoroughbred racehorse Telly's Pop, winner of several important California races for juveniles including the Norfolk Stakes and Del Mar Futurity.

Howard W. Koch suffered from Alzheimer's disease and died in at his home in Beverly Hills, California on February 16, 2001. He had two children from a marriage of 64 years to Ruth Pincus, who died in March 2009. In 2004, his son Hawk Koch was elected to the Board of Governors of the Academy of Motion Picture Arts and Sciences.

Filmography

Director

Film (director)
 Shield for Murder (1954)
 Big House, U.S.A. (1955)
 Untamed Youth (1957)
 Bop Girl Goes Calypso (1957)
 Jungle Heat (1957)
 The Girl in Black Stockings (1957)
 Fort Bowie (1957)
 Violent Road (1958)
 Frankenstein 1970 (1958)
 Born Reckless (1958)
 Andy Hardy Comes Home (1958)
 The Last Mile (1959)
 Badge 373 (1973)

Television (director)
 Maverick (1957) (1 episode)
 Hawaiian Eye (1959) (2 episodes)
 Cheyenne (1958) (1 episode)
 The Untouchables (1959) (4 episodes)
 The Gun of Zangara (1960) (TV movie)
 Miami Undercover (1961) (38 episodes)
 Texaco Presents Bob Hope in a Very Special Special: On the Road with Bing (1977)

Producer
Film (producer):
 War Paint (1953)
 Beachhead (1954)
 Shield for Murder (1954)
 Big House, U.S.A. (1955)
 Rebel in Town (1956)
 Frankenstein 1970 (1958)
 Sergeants 3 (1962)
 The Manchurian Candidate (1962)
 Come Blow Your Horn (1963)
 Robin and the 7 Hoods (1964)
 The Odd Couple (1968)
 On a Clear Day You Can See Forever (1970)
 A New Leaf (1971)
 Plaza Suite (1971)
 Last of the Red Hot Lovers (1972)
 Jacqueline Susann's Once Is Not Enough (1975)
 The Other Side of Midnight (1977)
 Airplane! (1980)
 Some Kind of Hero (1982)
 Airplane II: The Sequel (1982)
 Ghost (1990)

Television (producer)
 Magnavox Presents Frank Sinatra (1973)

References

External links
 

1916 births
2001 deaths
Film producers from New York (state)
20th-century American Jews
American film studio executives
American racehorse owners and breeders
Deaths from Alzheimer's disease
DeWitt Clinton High School alumni
Jean Hersholt Humanitarian Award winners
Peddie School alumni
Deaths from dementia in California
Presidents of the Academy of Motion Picture Arts and Sciences
Film directors from New York City